List of administrative division codes of the PRC in Division 3 or East China .

Shanghai (31)

Jiangsu (32)

Zhejiang (33)

Anhui (34)

Fujian (35)

Jiangxi (36)

Shandong (37)

China geography-related lists